Pavel Čmovš (born 29 June 1990) is a Czech professional footballer who plays as a defender for PAEEK.

Club career
Born in Plzeň, Čmovš has played for Slavia Prague, NEC, Veendam and Levski Sofia.

In July 2015 he returned to Indian club Mumbai City.

In July 2021, Čmovš signed with Pohronie. He made his Fortuna Liga debut on 25 July 2021 at Štadión Antona Malatinského against Spartak Trnava, in an opening game of the 2021–22 season. Pohronie lost 0–2 following a first-half goal from Roman Procházka and a second-half goal from Dejan Trajkovski. He was released during the 2021 winter break. He then signed for Academica Clinceni in January 2022, and PAEEK in August 2022.

International career
He has played youth international football for the Czech Republic.

References

1990 births
Living people
Sportspeople from Plzeň
Czech footballers
Czech Republic youth international footballers
Czech Republic under-21 international footballers
SK Slavia Prague players
NEC Nijmegen players
SC Veendam players
PFC Levski Sofia players
FC Rapid București players
Mumbai City FC players
FK Mladá Boleslav players
FK Teplice players
Nea Salamis Famagusta FC players
FK Pohronie players
LPS HD Clinceni players
Eerste Divisie players
Eredivisie players
First Professional Football League (Bulgaria) players
Indian Super League players
Liga I players
Czech First League players
Cypriot First Division players
Slovak Super Liga players
Association football defenders
Czech expatriate footballers
Czech expatriate sportspeople in the Netherlands
Expatriate footballers in the Netherlands
Czech expatriate sportspeople in Bulgaria
Expatriate footballers in Bulgaria
Czech expatriate sportspeople in Romania
Expatriate footballers in Romania
Czech expatriate sportspeople in India
Expatriate footballers in India
Czech expatriate sportspeople in Cyprus
Expatriate footballers in Cyprus
Czech expatriate sportspeople in Slovakia
Expatriate footballers in Slovakia
PAEEK players